The Electoral district of Pastoral Districts of Moreton, Wide Bay, Burnett, and Maranoa was an electorate of the New South Wales Legislative Council at a time when some of its members were elected and the balance were appointed by the Governor. It was a new electorate created in 1851 by the expansion of the Legislative Council to 54, 18 to be appointed and 36 elected. The district was named after the early settlements of Moreton Bay; Wide Bay, near Maryborough; the Burnett River, near Bundaberg; the Maranoa region of South-western Queensland.  These became part of Queensland on its establishment in 1859.

In 1856 the unicameral Legislative Council was abolished and replaced with an elected Legislative Assembly and an appointed Legislative Council. The district was represented by the Legislative Assembly electorate of Moreton, Wide Bay, Burnett and Maranoa.

Members

Election results

1851

1853
Francis Bigge resigned in December 1852.

See also
Members of the New South Wales Legislative Council, 1851-1856

References

Former electoral districts of New South Wales Legislative Council
Electoral districts of New South Wales in the area of Queensland
1851 establishments in Australia
1856 disestablishments in Australia